Bart Kaëll (born 2 August 1960 in Oudenaarde) is the stage name of Bart Marcel Emilienne Gyselinck, a Flemish singer and TV host.

Career
Kaëll studied music in Antwerp, after finishing school he landed a job as a singer and in 1982 he took part in the Baccara-beker, which he won. In 1983 Kaëll took part in Eurosong (Belgium heats for the Eurovision Song Contest) with the song Symphonie, he finished in third place. His next single La mamadora did well in the Flemish charts which he released in 1986. Kaëll took part again in Eurosong in 1987 with the song Carrousel, he was a favourite to win and represent Belgium at the Eurovision, however at the close of voting Carrousel had picked up 58 points placing Kaëll in second place, the winner was Liliane Saint-Pierre.

In 1997 Kaëll was offered by vtm to host the talent shows Soundmixshow (Dutch counterpart of the UK's Stars in Their Eyes) and Rad van Fortuin.

Personal life
In 2010, in response to rumors, Kaëll came out as homosexual; his partner is television presenter Luc Appermont.

Discography

Albums
 Bart Kaëll (1989)
 Amor Amor (1990)
 Mini Playback (1990)
 Gewoon omdat ik van je hou (1991)
 Bart Kaëll in kleur (1992)
 Dicht bij jou (1993)
 Het beste van Bart Kaëll (1994)
 Nooit meer alleen (1995)
 Dag en Nacht (1997)
 Noord en Zuid (1998)
 Face to Face (1998)
 15 jaar Bart Kaëll (1999)
 Costa Romantica (mit Vanessa Chinitor; 2001)
 Het beste van Bart Kaëll – 25 jaar hits (2008)
 Hallo, hier ben ik (2011)

Singles
 "Symphonie" (1983)
 "La Mamadora" (1986)
 "Carrousel" (1987)
 "De Marie-Louise" (1989)
 "Duizend terrassen in Rome" (1989)
 "Zeil je voor het eerst" (1989)
 "Ik heb je lief" (1998)
 "Beetje bij beetje" (2002)
 "Het is volle maan vannacht" (2006)
 "Dansen in Bahia" (2008)
 "Donder en bliksem" (2009)
 "Hallo goeie morgen!" (2010)
 "Mee met de wind" (2010)
 "Elke dag een beetje mooier" (2010)
 "Beetje gek" (2011)
 "Kap'tein" (2012)

External links
 Bart Kaëll official website

1960 births
Living people
People from Oudenaarde
Dutch-language singers of Belgium
Flemish television presenters
Belgian game show hosts
Belgian gay musicians
Belgian LGBT singers
Belgian LGBT songwriters
Belgian LGBT broadcasters
20th-century Belgian male singers
20th-century Belgian singers
21st-century Belgian male singers
21st-century Belgian singers
Gay singers
Gay songwriters
20th-century Belgian LGBT people
21st-century Belgian LGBT people